The 2012–13 AIK IF season is AIK's 29th season in the Elitserien ice hockey league (SEL), the top division in Sweden. They finished in ninth place in the regular season and failed to qualify for the playoffs.

Regular season

Standings

References 

2012–13 Elitserien season
2012-13